Ximen Qing is a fictional Chinese Song dynasty merchant, womanizer, and murderer in Yanggu County, Shandong. He is the male protagonist in the novel Jin Ping Mei and a minor character in the novel Water Margin.

In both novels, he is portrayed as a lascivious and immoral man who starts a secret affair with Pan Jinlian and helps her poison her husband Wu Dalang to death. Where the two novels differ is what happens when Wu Dalang's brother Wu Song confronts Ximen Qing at Lion Tower. In Water Margin, the older novel, Wu Song kills Ximen Qing in broad daylight and is exiled. In Jin Ping Mei, however, Ximen Qing escapes and bribes the county magistrate to have Wu Song arrested and exiled. Jin Ping Mei then follows Ximen Qing's degenerate pursuits of women and power until he dies from aphrodisiac overdose.

Sexual partners
Lady Chen, first wife
Wu Yueniang, second wife
Li Jiao'er, first concubine, originally a courtesan
Zhuo Diu'er, second concubine, originally a prostitute
Meng Yulou, third concubine, originally the wife of Yang Zongxi
Sun Xue'e, fourth concubine, originally a widower
Pan Jinlian(), lover, fifth concubine, originally the wife Wu Dalang
Li Ping'er, sixth concubine, originally the wife of Hua Zixu
Pang Xuemei, originally a maid
Yingchun, maid 
Xiuchun, maid 
Lanchun, maid 
Song Huilian, wife of Lai Wang
Wang Liu'er, wife of Han Daoguo
Ruyi'er
Ben Sisao
Huiyuan
Madam Lin
Li Guijie
Wu Yin'er
Zheng Aiyue
Zhang Xichun
Servant boy, homosexual partner

References
 
 
 
 
 
 
 

Fictional characters from Shandong
Fictional murderers